Lindesnes is a municipality in Agder county, Norway. It is located in the traditional district of Sørlandet. The administrative centre of the municipality is the town of Mandal. Other villages in Lindesnes include Åvik, Høllen, Skofteland, Svenevig, Vigmostad, Heddeland, Bjelland, Breland, Koland, Laudal, Øyslebø, Bykjernen, Skjebstad, Sånum-Lundevik, Skogsfjord-Hesland, Krossen, Harkmark, Skinsnes-Ime, and Tregde-Skjernøy.

The  municipality is the 126th largest by area out of the 356 municipalities in Norway. Lindesnes is the 55th most populous municipality in Norway with a population of 23,147.

General information

The municipality of Lindesnes was created as a new municipality on 1 January 1964 after the merger of the older municipalities of Spangereid (population: 899), Sør-Audnedal (population: 2,323), and Vigmostad (population: 589).

On 1 January 2020, the neighboring municipalities of Mandal and Marnardal were merged into Lindesnes, creating a much larger municipality of Lindesnes. At the same time, the administrative centre of the new, larger municipality was moved to the town of Mandal.

Name
That name is derived from the verb  which means "lead/go to an end" and the meaning is probably just "the end". A later form was  where the word nes which means "headland" was added (a word that is related to the English forms ness and naze). The traditional English language version of the name is just the Naze, derived from ness meaning headland.

Coat of arms
The coat of arms was granted on 25 April 1986. The official blazon is "Azure a lighthouse issuant argent". This means the arms have a blue field (background) and the charge is the top of a lighthouse. The lighthouse has a tincture of argent which means it is commonly colored white, but if it is made out of metal, then silver is used. The lighthouse represents the local Lindesnes Lighthouse, the oldest lighthouse in Norway. It was built in 1655 on the Lindesnes peninsula. The arms were designed by Truls Nygaard who based it after a design by Rolf Dybvig. On 1 January 2020, the municipality was enlarged and on that date, the coat of arms was updated to a slightly different design and the addition of a mural crown above the escutcheon to represent the fact that the municipality now includes the town of Mandal. The color was also changed to a more teal blue.

Churches
The Church of Norway has eight parishes within the municipality of Lindesnes. It is part of the Lister og Mandal prosti (deanery) in the Diocese of Agder og Telemark.

Government
All municipalities in Norway, including Lindesnes, are responsible for primary education (through 10th grade), outpatient health services, senior citizen services, unemployment and other social services, zoning, economic development, and municipal roads. The municipality is governed by a municipal council of elected representatives, which in turn elect a mayor.  The municipality falls under the Agder District Court and the Agder Court of Appeal.

Municipal council
The municipal council of Lindesnes is made up of 21 representatives that are elected to four year terms. The tables below show the current and historical composition of the council by political party.

Geography
Lindesnes is a coastal municipality, with a long stretch of coastline to the south. It borders Lyngdal municipality to the west, Evje og Hornnes to the north, and Kristiansand and Vennesla to the east. The southern coast of Lindesnes is rugged and includes several fjords such as the Snigsfjorden and Grønsfjorden as well as many islands such as Svinør. The interior of the municipality follows the Audnadalen valley through which the river Audna flows south into the Snigsfjorden.

Climate
Lindesnes has a temperate oceanic climate (Cfb). The weather station has been recording since January 1863, and is situated near the Lindesnes lighthouse on a peninsula protruding into the sea. It is the southernmost mainland point in Norway. 
The all-time high temperature is  recorded August 1975; the all-time low is  recorded in January 1987. The five months May - September have not seen any overnight freeze, with coldest low  in May 1981 (data since 1954).

Notable residents

Public service & public thinking 

 Peder Claussøn Friis (1545-1614), a Norwegian clergyman and author
 Søren Jaabæk (1814 in Holum – 1894) a politician and farmer; longest-serving member of the Norwegian Parliament from 1845 to 1891
 Geirulf Bugge (1862 in Mandal – 1940) a Norwegian judge & Supreme Court Justice
 Ivar An Christensen (1868 in Mandal – 1934) a ship owner, with a fleet of eleven steam ships
 Elise Sem (1870–1950) a barrister, women's activist and sports official; grew up in Manadal
 Ellen Gleditsch (1879 in Mandal – 1968) a radiochemist and Norway's second female professor 
 Karen Platou (1879 in Mandal – 1950) politician, the first woman elected Member of Parliament
 Arne Askildsen (1898–1982) politician and bailiff of Mandal and Halse og Harkmark 1928–1968, except in WWII
 Asbjørn Aavik (1902 in Åvik - 1997) a Norwegian Lutheran missionary to China and writer
 Leif Edwardsen (1922 in Mandal - 2002), Norwegian diplomat
 Knut Aukland (1929 in Vigmostad – 2014) a Norwegian physiologist
 Ole-Johan Dahl (1931 in Mandal – 2002) Norway's foremost computer scientist
 Ludvig Hope Faye (1931–2017) a Norwegian politician, Mayor of Mandal 1972–1975. 
 Ansgar Gabrielsen (born 1955 in Mandal) a Norwegian consultant and former politician
 Janne Haaland Matláry (born 1957) a political scientist, writer, politician and academic

The Arts 
 Adolph Tidemand (1814 in Mandal – 1876) a romantic nationalism painter
 Olaf Isaachsen (1835 in Madal – 1893) a landscape and genre painter 
 Amaldus Nielsen (1838 in Halse – 1932) "Norway's first naturalist painter"
 Gustav Vigeland (1869 in Halse og Harkmark - 1943) a Norwegian sculptor, associated with the Vigeland Sculptures in Frogner Park, Oslo and designed the Nobel Peace Prize medal
 Emanuel Vigeland (1875 in Halse og Harkmark - 1948) a multi-talented Norwegian artist
 Kjell Askildsen (born  1929 in Mandal) a writer of minimalistic short stories
 Tobias Santelmann (born 1980) a German-born Norwegian actor, grew up in Lindesnes 
 Helene Bøksle (born 1981 in Mandal) a Norwegian singer and actress

Sport 
 Per Arne Nilsen (born 1961 in Mandal) a sailor, participated at the 1984 Summer Olympics
 Bjarne Røyland (born 1971 in Mandal) a bobsledder, competed at the 2002 Winter Olympics

References

External links
 
 
 
 Municipal fact sheet from Statistics Norway 

 
Municipalities of Agder
1964 establishments in Norway
Headlands of Norway
North Sea